Pitcairnia pavonii is a species of plant in the family Bromeliaceae. It is endemic to Ecuador.  Its natural habitats are subtropical or tropical moist montane forests, subtropical or tropical dry shrubland, and subtropical or tropical high-altitude shrubland. It is threatened by habitat loss.

References

Flora of Ecuador
pavonii
Near threatened plants
Taxonomy articles created by Polbot
Plants described in 1896